Nebulosa nasor is a moth of the family Notodontidae first described by Herbert Druce in 1899. It is found along the western slope of the Colombian Andes.

The length of the forewings is 17–18.5 mm for males and 20 mm for females.

References

Moths described in 1899
Notodontidae of South America